The List of second division football clubs in Asian Football Confederation (AFC) countries.

For clubs playing at top divisions, see List of top-division football clubs in AFC countries.
For clubs belonging to any of the other five continental football confederations of the world, see List of association football clubs.

Bangladesh

Football association: Bangladesh Football Federation
Second-level league: Bangladesh Championship League

As of 2021-22 season:

Cambodia 

Football association: Football Federation of Cambodia
Second-level league: Cambodian League 2

As of 2022 season:

China 

Football association: Chinese Football Association
Second-level league: China League One

As of 2022 season:

Chinese Taipei 

See Chinese Taipei for the naming issue.

Football association: Chinese Taipei Football Association
Top-level league: Taiwan Second Division Football League

As of 2022 season:

Hong Kong 

Football association: The Hong Kong Football Association
Second-level league: Hong Kong First Division League

As of 2021–22 season:

India 

Football association: All India Football Federation
Second-level league: I-League

As of 2022–23 season:

Indonesia 

Football association: Football Association of Indonesia
Second-level league: Liga 2

As of 2022–23 season:

Iran 

Football association: Football Federation Islamic Republic of Iran
Second-level league: Azadegan League
As of 2022–23 season:

Iraq 

Football association: Iraq Football Association
Second-level league: Iraq Division One

As of 2021–22 season:

Japan 

Football association: Japan Football Association
Second-level league: J2 League

As of 2022 season:

Lebanon 

Football association: Lebanon Football Association
Second-level league: Lebanese Second Division

As of 2020–21 season:

Malaysia 

Football association: Football Association of Malaysia
Second-level league: Malaysia Premier League

As of 2022 season:

Maldives 

Football association: Football Association of Maldives
Second-level league: Maldivian Second Division Football Tournament

As of 2020 season:

Mongolia 
Mongolian First League

Myanmar 

Football association: Myanmar Football Federation
Second-level league: Myanmar National League 2

As of 2021 season:

Nepal 

Football association: All Nepal Football Association
Second-level League: Martyr's Memorial B-Division League

As of 2022 season:

Pakistan 

Football association: Pakistan Football Federation
Second-level league: PFF League

As of 2020 season:

Saudi Arabia 

 Football association: Saudi Arabia Football Federation
 Second-level league: Prince Mohammad bin Salman League 
 
As of 2021-22 season:

South Korea 

Football association: Korea Football Association
Second-level league: K League 2

As of 2022 season:

Tajikistan 

Football association: Tajikistan Football Federation
Second-level league: Tajikistan First League

As of 2021 season:

Thailand 

Football association: Football Association of Thailand
Second-level league: Thai League 2

As of 2022-23 season:

United Arab Emirates 

Football association: United Arab Emirates Football Association
Second-level league: UAE Division One

As of 2021–22 season:

Uzbekistan 

Football association: Uzbekistan Football Federation
Second-level league: Uzbekistan Pro League

As of 2020 season:

Vietnam 

Football association: Vietnam Football Federation
Second-level league: V.League 2

As of 2022 season:

See also
 List of top-division football clubs in AFC countries
List of top-division football clubs in CAF countries
List of top-division football clubs in CONCACAF countries
List of top-division football clubs in CONMEBOL countries
List of top-division football clubs in OFC countries
List of top-division football clubs in UEFA countries
List of top-division football clubs in non-FIFA countries
List of second division football clubs in UEFA countries

References

External links 
National Associations, AFC.
The RSSSF Archive - Domestic Results (Asia and Oceania), Rec.Sport.Soccer Statistics Foundation.

Lists of association football clubs
Association football in Asia